Len Milburn (19 July 1908 – 4 March 1998) was an  Australian rules footballer who played with South Melbourne in the Victorian Football League (VFL).

Notes

External links 

1908 births
1998 deaths
Australian rules footballers from Victoria (Australia)
Sydney Swans players